Peter Rufai (born 24 August 1963) is a Nigerian former professional footballer who played as a goalkeeper.

He competed professionally in Belgium, the Netherlands, Portugal and Spain, in a senior career that lasted 20 years.

Rufai represented Nigeria in two World Cups and as many Africa Cup of Nations tournaments.

Club career
Born in Lagos, Rufai started his career in his country, playing with Stationery Stores F.C. and Femo Scorpions. He moved to Benin in 1986, with AS Dragons FC de l'Ouémé.

At a more professional level Rufai spent six years in Belgium, with K.S.C. Lokeren Oost-Vlaanderen and K.S.K. Beveren, although he appeared sparingly. In the 1993–94 season he played 12 matches for Dutch neighbours Go Ahead Eagles, which finished 12th in the Eredivisie.

In 1994, Rufai started a Portuguese adventure with S.C. Farense. In his first year, he was instrumental as the Algarve side only conceded 38 goals in 34 matches, qualifying to the UEFA Cup for the first time ever. His solid performances earned him a transfer to La Liga, but he struggled to start for lowly Hércules CF during his stay, in an eventual relegation.

However, Rufai signed with established Deportivo de La Coruña the ensuing summer, backing up another African, Jacques Songo'o, for two seasons – this included keeping a clean sheet in a January 1998 home win against CD Tenerife (1–0) as the Cameroonian was suspended. He then returned to Portugal for one final year, with modest Gil Vicente FC, also being second-choice.

Rufai returned to Spain in 2003, settling in the country and opening a goalkeeper's school.

International career
Rufai earned 65 caps for Nigeria and represented the nation at two FIFA World Cups in 1994 and 1998 as their first-choice goalkeeper and also helped the Super Eagles win the 1994 African Cup of Nations in Tunisia.

On 24 July 1993, during a CAN qualifying match against Ethiopia, Rufai scored a penalty in a 6–0 home win.

International goals

Personal life
Rufai was the son of a tribal king in the region of Idimu. In early 1998, as his father died, he was allowed by his club (Deportivo) to return to Nigeria to discuss the succession, but turned down the status for himself.

Rufai's oldest son, Senbaty, played as a midfielder, having tried for Sunshine Stars F.C. in the Nigeria Premier League.

References

External links

1963 births
Living people
Sportspeople from Lagos
Nigerian footballers
Yoruba sportspeople
Association football goalkeepers
Nigeria Professional Football League players
AS Dragons FC de l'Ouémé players
Belgian Pro League players
K.S.C. Lokeren Oost-Vlaanderen players
K.S.K. Beveren players
Eredivisie players
Go Ahead Eagles players
Primeira Liga players
S.C. Farense players
Gil Vicente F.C. players
La Liga players
Hércules CF players
Deportivo de La Coruña players
Nigeria international footballers
1994 FIFA World Cup players
1998 FIFA World Cup players
1988 African Cup of Nations players
1994 African Cup of Nations players
1995 King Fahd Cup players
Africa Cup of Nations-winning players
Nigerian expatriate footballers
Expatriate footballers in Benin
Expatriate footballers in Belgium
Expatriate footballers in the Netherlands
Expatriate footballers in Portugal
Expatriate footballers in Spain
Nigerian expatriate sportspeople in Benin
Nigerian expatriate sportspeople in Belgium
Nigerian expatriate sportspeople in the Netherlands
Nigerian expatriate sportspeople in Portugal
Nigerian expatriate sportspeople in Spain